Cyperus microcristatus is a species of sedge that is endemic to an area of Cameroon.

The species was first formally described by the botanist Kåre Arnstein Lye in 2006.

See also
 List of Cyperus species

References

microcristatus
Plants described in 2006
Flora of Cameroon